Mojaš Radonjić (Cyrillic: Мојаш Радоњић; born 23 February 1949) is a Montenegrin football manager and former player.

Club career
Radonjić started football at the age of 17, where he played with Lovćen and then transferred to Budućnost Titograd in 1976, where in the 1980–81 season he emerged as the second scorer in the Yugoslav league, with 15 goals. In his time at Budućnost Titograd, he became the club's all-time top scorer in the Yugoslav First League. He also briefly played overseas for the Tampa Bay Rowdies in the North American Soccer League. In December 1981, he transferred to AEK Athens following Dušan Bajević's suggestion and afterwards was tested by the team's coach, Hans Tilkowski.
It was about a tall striker, strong and good in the high game, but in the year and a half of his presence in AEK, he did not have a high performance. On 21 February 1981, his goal against Panathinaikos at home gave AEK the victory. He scored in two consecutive league matches against Olympiacos and gave his club the point of the tie. In the summer of 1983 he was released from AEK even though his contract had a duration of one more year and he returned to Yugoslavia to play for Sutjeska Nikšić before he retired in 1985.

Manageria career
Radonjić followed a coaching career coaching Budućnost Titograd many times. In the summer of 1999 he returned to Greece to manage Panachaiki, but due to the negative results and the low position in the standings he was fired in the middle of the year. From December 2014 to December 2018, Radonjić served as manager of the Montenegro national under-21 team. He also managed various clubs in Yugoslavia, Montenegro, Greece, and Albania.

References

External links

1949 births
Living people
Sportspeople from Cetinje
Association football forwards
Montenegrin footballers
Yugoslav footballers
FK Lovćen players
FK Budućnost Podgorica players
Tampa Bay Rowdies (1975–1993) players
AEK Athens F.C. players
FK Sutjeska Nikšić players
Yugoslav First League players
North American Soccer League (1968–1984) players
Yugoslav expatriate footballers
Expatriate soccer players in the United States
Yugoslav expatriate sportspeople in the United States
FK Sutjeska Nikšić managers
FK Budućnost Podgorica managers
FK Mogren managers
Panachaiki F.C. managers
KF Vllaznia Shkodër managers
FK Lovćen managers
Yugoslav football managers
Serbia and Montenegro football managers
Kategoria Superiore managers
Serbia and Montenegro expatriate football managers
Expatriate football managers in Greece
Serbia and Montenegro expatriate sportspeople in Greece
Montenegrin football managers
Montenegrin expatriate football managers
Expatriate football managers in Albania
Montenegrin expatriate sportspeople in Albania